Charles James Leesman (born March 10, 1987) is an American former professional baseball pitcher. He also played in Major League Baseball (MLB) for the Chicago White Sox. He made his major league debut on August 9, 2013. Before his professional career, Leesman attended Xavier University, where he played college baseball for the Xavier Musketeers.

Minors
Leesman was drafted by the Minnesota Twins in the 40th round of the 2005 MLB Draft, but did not sign, opting to attend Xavier University, where he played for the Xavier Musketeers baseball team. Leesman was then drafted by the Chicago White Sox in the 11th round of the 2008 MLB Draft, and signed. Leesman then started his professional baseball career with the White Sox rookie league Bristol White Sox.

In 2009, Leesman spent the entire season with the Class A Kannapolis Intimidators and finishing the season with a record of 13-5, 3.08 ERA and 117 strikeouts in 157+ innings. In 2010, Leesman started the season with Class A-Advanced Winston-Salem before getting promoted to Double-A Birmingham. He finished the 2010 season combined with a 14-6 record, 4.07 ERA and 90 strikeouts in 148+ innings. Before the 2011 season, the White Sox added Leesman to their 40-man roster to protect him from the Rule 5 draft after the season. Leesman spent the 2012 season with the Triple-A Charlotte Knights and finished with a 12-10 record, 2.47 ERA and 103 strikeouts in 135 innings. Leesman injured his ACL during International League playoffs.

Leesman was designated for assignment by the White Sox on April 14, 2013, and claimed off waivers by the Rangers. The Rangers outrighted Leesman to the minor leagues, but he declined the assignment, becoming a free agent. Leesman then signed back with the White Sox on April 23, 2013.

Career

Chicago White Sox
On July 9, 2013, Leesman's contract was purchased from Charlotte and placed on the White Sox roster as the 26th player due to the doubleheader exemption. On August 9, 2013, Leesman made his Major League debut in the second game of a doubleheader against the Minnesota Twins. He was designated for assignment on August 16, 2014 and released on August 20.

Pittsburgh Pirates
On January 9, 2015, he signed a minor league contract with the Pittsburgh Pirates.

Wichita Wingnuts
On March 31, 2016, Leesman signed with the Wichita Wingnuts of the American Association of Independent Professional Baseball. He was released on October 20, 2017.

References

External links

Sox believe lefty Leesman has the right stuff

1987 births
Living people
Baseball players from Cincinnati
Chicago White Sox players
Xavier Musketeers baseball players
Bristol White Sox players
Kannapolis Intimidators players
Winston-Salem Dash players
Birmingham Barons players
Charlotte Knights players
Major League Baseball pitchers
Indianapolis Indians players
Indios de Mayagüez players
Peoria Saguaros players
Glendale Desert Dogs players
Arizona League White Sox players
Wichita Wingnuts players